The Town House is a large former hotel property built in 1929 on Wilshire Boulevard, adjacent to Lafayette Park in the Westlake district of Los Angeles, California.  After a long career as a hotel it operates today as low income housing.

The Town House was developed by oil magnate Edward Doheny as one of the most luxurious apartment-hotels in Southern California. Designed by Norman W. Alpaugh, and built at a cost of $3 million, it opened on September 11, 1929. It is a very late example of the Beaux Arts style, with a brick and terra cotta facade with classical detailing. The building was converted to operate exclusively as a hotel in 1937, featuring one of the most glamorous bars in the city, the Zebra Room, with interiors by noted designer Wayne McAllister.

Conrad Hilton bought the Town House in 1942, paying owner Arnold Kirkeby $150,000 cash and assuming $830,000 of debt. Elizabeth Taylor celebrated her first marriage, to Hilton heir Conrad Hilton, Jr., at the hotel in 1950. The Town House was sold to Sheraton Hotels in 1954 and became the Sheraton-Town House. In 1958, Sheraton renamed the hotel the Sheraton-West Hotel. Sheraton sold the hotel to the Kyo-Ya group in 1972, although Sheraton retained management. In 1976, the hotel added four tennis courts at the rear of the enormous property, which covered nearly an entire city block. In 1978 the hotel's name reverted to the Sheraton-Town House.  From the 1960s through the 1980s, the area around Lafayette Park became less desirable and more dangerous and after the 1992 Los Angeles Riots, the hotel finally closed in February 1993.

Just as it was about to be demolished, the property was purchased by developer Rob MacLeod. He enlisted the Santa Monica-based firm of Killefer Flammang Architects (KFA), noted for their renovations of historic buildings, to convert the 255-room hotel into 142 units of low-income housing, under a 55-year covenant. The building reopened in December 2001. In 2017, the north half of the massive 1.8 acre property, containing the long-abandoned tennis courts and the hotel parking lot, was redeveloped by Century West Partners as a new 398-unit apartment complex, Next on Sixth, also designed by KFA. The Town House is currently owned by the Central Valley Coalition for Affordable Housing.

The Town House was designated a Los Angeles Historic-Cultural Monument in 1994 and was listed on the National Register of Historic Places, and in 1997. Other registered historic sites within one block of the Town House include the Bryson Apartment Hotel, Bullocks Wilshire, the Felipe de Neve branch of the Los Angeles Public Library system, and the Granada Shoppes and Studios.

See also
 List of Los Angeles Historic-Cultural Monuments in the Wilshire and Westlake areas
 National Register of Historic Places listings in Los Angeles

References

External links

Hotel buildings on the National Register of Historic Places in Los Angeles
Los Angeles Historic-Cultural Monuments
Residential buildings in Los Angeles
Hotels established in 1929
Mediterranean Revival architecture in California
Westlake, Los Angeles
Hotel buildings completed in 1929
Sheraton hotels